Hemigenia purpurea, with the common name of narrow-leaved hemigenia is a small plant growing in the Sydney  and Nowra districts of eastern Australia. Often found in poor soils in heathland with a relatively high rainfall. By the coast or in the Blue Mountains.

A small shrub up to 2 metres tall. Leaves in whorls of three. Leaves hairless, narrow, 1 to 1.6 cm long, 1 mm wide, wedged shape with an acute angle at the base of the leaf. Narrow and pointed at the end of the leaf. Leaf stem 2 to 4 mm long. Attractive blue or violet flowers appear mostly from August to April.

Hemigenia purpurea appears similar to certain plants of the genus Prostanthera; however, it is distinguished by the thin leaves.

References

purpurea
Lamiales of Australia
Endemic flora of Australia
Flora of New South Wales
Plants described in 1810